Éanna Ní Lamhna (born 1950, in County Louth) is an Irish biologist, environmental consultant, radio and television presenter, author and educator. She is one of the best-known public figures in Ireland in the area of nature and the environment, and was listed as one of Ireland's "Influential 100" in 2012.  She was president of the national environmental charity An Taisce (which has a statutory role in the planning process in Ireland) for five years in the 2000s.

She was also President of the Tree Council of Ireland from 2012 to 2014 and currently serves as its vice-president.

Early life
Ní Lamhna was born and reared in Stabannon, near Castlebellingham, Co. Louth.  Her father, Peadar Ó Lamhna, was a teacher in the local national school, and taught her in 5th-7th class.

Career
Ní Lamhna qualified in the biology area at UCD, including botany and microbiology and postgraduate studies in plant ecology.  She pursued studies in the area of entomology, and also has a known interest in bats.  She also qualified to teach in Irish second-level schools, with the Higher Diploma in Education.  In later years, she also received a Ph.D.
Ní Lamhna went to work for State environmental agency An Foras Forbartha (now the EPA) and played a key role in ground-breaking species distribution mapping carried out in Ireland by that body in the 1970s and 1980s.  In the same period she also served for some years as Hon. Secretary for the Irish part of the Botanical Society of the British Isles.  In 1988 she took early retirement and began work as a consultant, educator, and in broadcasting.  She has worked extensively with primary and secondary schools, including on such programmes as Heritage in Schools and the Ringo Project, and as an inspector of trainee teachers. She has also lectured in the Dublin Institute of Technology, notably on Sustainable Development.

Broadcasting
Ní Lamhna has worked on Mooney and its predecessor Mooney Goes Wild since 1995.  She also featured on TV series Creature Feature and was a regular on children's programme The Den.  She has appeared multiple times on The Late Late Show and has also appeared on The Panel, Celebrity Jigs 'n' Reels, and other programmes.

In May 2020, Ní Lamhna released a two-part interview as part of David Oakes’ Trees A Crowd podcast.

Writing
Ní Lamhna has co-written, edited or written a number of books, including:
 Provisional Distribution Atlas of Amphibians, Reptiles and Mammals in Ireland, 2nd edition (editor), Dublin: Foras Forbatha, 1979
 Distribution Atlas of Butterflies in Ireland: European Invertebrate Survey (editor), Dublin: Foras Forbatha, 1980
 Air Quality Surveys of various parts of Ireland (co-author), Dublin: Foras Forbatha, 1983-1988
 Talking Wild: Wildlife on the Radio, Dublin: Townhouse, 2002
 Science All Around Me (3, 4, 5, 6) (co-author), Dublin: Educational Company of Ireland, 2003-2004
 Wild and Wonderful, Dublin: Townhouse, 2004
 Straight Talking Wild: More Wildlife on the Radio, Dublin: Townhouse, 2006
 Wild Dublin, Dublin: O'Brien Press, May 2008
 Wildlife in Schools: A Book for Primary School Teachers, Navan: Meath Co. Council (with Laois and Monaghan Co. Councils), 2009

and papers including worksheets for schoolchildren and:
 Oil Pollution Monitoring (beached birds) 1985–1986, Dublin: Foras Foratha, 1986
 Terenure Wildlife, a baseline study of the Terenure area, 1992
 Terenure Wildlife Management Plan, Terenure (Dublin): Terenure Tidy Towns Committee, 2006?

Charitable work
Ní Lamhna has a record of charitable events, including talks and guided walks for good causes.  She was also president of An Taisce from 2004 to 2009.

Public figure
Ní Lamhna is one of the best-known environmental figures in Ireland, and is at number 96 in the "Influential 100" list voted in by a broad panel for Ireland's Village Magazine in early 2012; she was one of just three environmental figures on that list (with Frank Convery and Frank McDonald).  She is also a member of the statutory Advisory Committee of Ireland's Environmental Protection Agency, having been nominated by the Irish Environmental Network for the 2010–2013 term.

Personal life
Ní Lamhna is married to John Harding, and they have two sons and one daughter.  She has lived in Dublin since 1967.  She is a fluent speaker of Irish, and does talks, broadcasts and school visits in Irish.

References

External links
 Eanna Lamhna: The CV, Irish Independent, Sunday 18 July 2004, retrieved 30 May 2012
 Second section is personal profile (from profiles of the Mooney team at RTÉ.ie)

1950 births
20th-century Irish botanists
21st-century Irish botanists
Living people
Alumni of University College Dublin
Irish children's television presenters
Irish entomologists
People from Castlebellingham
Radio personalities from the Republic of Ireland
RTÉ Radio 1 presenters
RTÉ television presenters
Irish women radio presenters
Irish women television presenters
Women botanists
Women entomologists
21st-century Irish women scientists
20th-century Irish women scientists
Irish women botanists